Henry Lesser (born 8 May 1963) is a former German footballer.

The quick offensive player spent most of his East German top-flight career with FC Carl Zeiss Jena. During this spell Lesser won 4 caps for the East Germany national team - all in 1986.

References

External links
 
 
 

1963 births
Living people
German footballers
East German footballers
East Germany international footballers
FC Carl Zeiss Jena players
Borussia Fulda players
People from Wartburgkreis
Footballers from Thuringia
Association football midfielders